Saramandaia is a 1976 Brazilian telenovela created by Dias Gomes, produced and aired by TV Globo.

Cast

References

External links 
 Saramandaia at IMDb

1976 telenovelas
TV Globo telenovelas
Brazilian telenovelas
1976 Brazilian television series debuts
Portuguese-language telenovelas
1976 Brazilian television series endings